Lumber hooker is a nautical term for a Great Lakes ship designed to carry her own deck load of lumber and to tow one or two barges. The barges were schooner barges: large old schooners stripped of their masts and running gear to carry large cargoes of lumber.

See also
 Consort (nautical)
Orin W. Angwall
SS Myron

References

Steamships
Lumber schooners
Barges
Timber industry
Log transport
+Lumber hooker
Nautical terminology